Achirus novoae is a species of sole in the family Achiridae. It was described by Fernando Cervigón in 1982. It inhabits the Orinoco River.

References

Pleuronectiformes
Taxa named by Fernando Cervigón
Fish described in 1982